"Wait on Me" is a song performed by English pop band Rixton. It was released on 23 July 2014 as the second single from their debut album, Let the Road (2015). The song was written by Benny Blanco, Stargate, Wayne Hector, Ross Golan, Jennifer Decilveo, and Robopop, and it was produced by Blanco and Stargate.

Music video
A lyric video for the song was released on 22 September with footage of Rixton's Me and My Broken Heart Tour on the US. The official music video was released on 9 October, the plot of the video shows two endings.

Critical reception
Sylvie Lesas of Evigshed Magazine gave the song four and a half stars out of five, saying: "[The song] is an infectious blend of pop-rock, reggae influences into a danceable anthem. It reminds you a little bit of Maroon 5. The song is a huge summer jam, both haunting and sweet, to make you dance all night on the beach…"

Live performances
Rixton performed "Wait on Me" in the show Late Night with Seth Meyers on 5 August. The song was also performed with "Me and My Broken Heart" on the Teen Choice Awards on 10 August.

Track listing
Digital download

Charts

Release history

References

2014 singles
2014 songs
Interscope Records singles
Rixton (band) songs
Schoolboy Records singles
Song recordings produced by Benny Blanco
Song recordings produced by Stargate (record producers)
Songs written by Benny Blanco
Songs written by Tor Erik Hermansen
Songs written by Mikkel Storleer Eriksen
Songs written by Wayne Hector
Songs written by Robopop
Songs written by Ross Golan
Songs written by Jennifer Decilveo